The rivière des Sept Ponts (English: river of the seven bridges) is a tributary of the rivière du Berger flowing in the sectors of Beauport and Charlesbourg,  in Quebec City, Quebec, Canada.

The upper part of the valley of the Sept Ponts river does not have a road. Its lower part, downstream from Lac Bégon, is located mainly in urban areas and is mainly served by Boulevard Henri-Bourassa, Rue Sophia Melvin and Rue des Nations Est.

The surface of the Sept Ponts river (except the rapids areas) is generally frozen from the beginning of December to the end of March; however, safe circulation on the ice is generally done from the end of December to the beginning of March. The water level of the river varies with the seasons and the precipitation; the spring flood occurs in March or April.

Geography 
The Rivière des Sept Ponts is the second main tributary of the watershed of the rivière du Berger. It rises at the confluence of two mountain streams in a wooded and mountainous area north of the borough of Beauport. This source is located at:
 south-east of the center of Lac-Beauport;
 south-west of the summit of Montagne des Trois Sommets (altitude: ;
 north-west of Lac des Roches which is the head lake of the rivière des Roches;
 north of the confluence of the Sept Ponts river and the rivière du Berger.

 to the south with a good drop in a steep valley, to the Chicots stream (coming from the northeast);
 to the south by forming a hook towards the southwest, displaying a good drop in a deep valley and crossing Lake Bégon at the end of the segment up to the dam at its mouth;
 to the south by crossing rue de l'Aventure and crossing Lac Flamand at the end of the segment, until its mouth. Note: Plage-Laurentides is located east of Lac Flamand;
 to the south by entering the residential area, crossing the rue du Dublin, Sophia Melvin and des Nation Est, until it meets the Berger river.

Toponymy 
The toponym "Rivière des Sept Ponts" was formalized on March 28, 1974, at the Commission de toponymie du Québec.

See also 
List of rivers of Quebec

References 

Rivers of Capitale-Nationale
Landforms of Quebec City